Olive Ashworth (1915 – 2000) was an Australian artist, textile designer and photographer.

She is acknowledged as a significant contributor to Australian textile design during the 1950s.

Collections

Ashworth's works are held in the collections of the National Gallery of Australia (including Aquarelle, Mushroom coral, and Reef fantasy), and the Queensland Art Gallery (includes Design for Coral garden,  Design for Reef fantasy, Design for Queensland, and Great Barrier Reef neck tie).

The State Library of Queensland also has a pair of toy ducks designed and made by Ashworth.

The Olive Ashworth Textile Collection is held by the Queensland Museum.

Exhibitions

Group
Women Artists of North Queensland, Perc Tucker Regional Gallery (1995)
Women Hold Up Half The Sky, National Gallery of Australia (1995)
New Woman, Museum of Brisbane 2019)

Significance
On Ashworth, the Queensland Art Gallery wrote: "Olive Ashworth is one of the few Australians, and the only Queensland-based artist, to contribute significantly to textile design in the 1950s".

References

External links 
 Queensland Museum: Selling Queensland includes bikini designed by Ashworth

1915 births
2000 deaths
20th-century Australian women artists
20th-century Australian artists
Artists from Brisbane
Australian women illustrators
Australian women photographers
Book designers
Textile designers
Toy designers